Khed City is an Industrial park near Pune, India. With an area of over 4200 acres, Khed city is a joint venture between Kalyani group and MIDC (Maharashtra Industrial Development Corporation).

History 
Khed City came into existence in the year 2010. Khed City, was formed under Khed Economic Infrastructure Ltd (KEIPL), which is a joint venture between Maharashtra Industrial Development Corporation (MIDC) and Kalyani Group.

Civic Administration 

The 4200 acres of land is divided into Domestic Tariff Area, a sector specific SEZ (Engineering and Electronic sector), and social infrastructure along with a rehabilitation and resettlement area for the displaced locals. It falls under the ‘C’ zone as per the Maharashtra Industrial policy 2013. The Non-industrial area has a provision of support services including academic, social, entertainment, healthcare, and other facilities for its citizens.

Geography 

Khed city is located in Khed Taluka of Pune district, at an altitude of approximately 2,100 feet above sea level, at the intersection of Western Ghats and the Deccan Plateaus. It is situated between the latitudes of approximately 18.8405° North and 73.9072° East.

Climate 

The district experiences a hot semi-arid climate bordering with tropical wet and dry with average temperatures ranging between 20 and 28 °C (68 and 82 °F).

Three main seasons:
 Summer – March to June; Max Temp 42 °C (108 °F)
 Monsoon – July to October; Temp 22 to 28 °C (72 to 82 °F)
 Winter – November to Feb; Temp 7 to 22 °C (44 to 71 °F)

Languages 
Marathi is the official and most spoken language, while English, Hindi, Gujarati and Kannada are spoken by a considerable part of the population. Majority of the residents know at least 3 different languages.

Economy 
As of 2019, Khed City has over 47 domestic and multinational companies.  Mars International, the wholly owned subsidiary of Mars Inc. Has invested around 1000 Crore for their chocolate manufacturing plant. Hyosung T&D, a subsidiary of the South Korean Automotive manufacturer, Hyosung Corps, has a green field manufacturing unit in 14 Acres. Maxion wheels, a worlds leader in  automotive wheel manufacturing, has invested around Rs. 350 Crore for their 20 Acre manufacturing unit. Amul India has invested for an Ice Cream manufacturing facility in 11 Acres worth. Kalyani Transmission Technologies Ltd (KTTL), a division of Kalyani Technoforge Ltd (KTFL), have their manufacturing facility in Khed City, Pune. Other major names include JSW MI Steel, Lenze Mechatronics, Linnhoff India, Hira Technologies, Maico Ventilation

Clients 
 Amul India
 KTTL – Kalyani Transmission Technologies
 Hyosung
 Maxion Wheels
 Mars international
 JSW Steel
 Lenze Mechatronics
 Linnhoff India
 Hira technologies
 Maico Ventilation
 Hengtong
 Autogen

Transportation

Public transportation 
Public transportation in Pune includes Pune Suburban Railway, bus services operated by PMPML and auto rickshaws. Online transport network companies such as Uber and Ola Cabs also provide rideshare and taxi services in the city. Construction of Pune Metro, an urban mass rapid transit system, is underway as of 2018. Distance between Khed city and Pune Railway Station – 53 km  Distance between Khed city and Pune Airport – 50 km  Distance between Khed city and JNPT – 146 km

Pune-Nashik railway corridor 
The Maharashtra state government has recently announced the proposal of connecting Pune & Nashik via a 231 km railway line. According to the Maharashtra Railway Infrastructure Development Limited, the laying of tracks will commence from Feb 2019. Once complete, It will be used not only by passengers but also for transporting agricultural and industrial goods.

References 

Industrial parks in India
Economy of Maharashtra
Special Economic Zones of India